= Bin Swelah =

Emirati actor and comedian

- Born: Ali Saleh Awadh AlJaberi; 17 November 1996 (age 29); Al Ain, Abu Dhabi, UAE
- Occupations: Actor and Comedian
- Years active: 2014–present

Bin Swelah (Arabic: بن صويلح; born 17 November 1996) in Abu Dhabi, UAE is an Emirati actor and stand-up comedian.

== Early life and career ==
Bin Swelah also known as Ali Saleh Awadh AlJaberi born in Al Ain but later moved to Bani yas. Bin Swelah started his career as a Theater Artist in 2013 from Al Qasba Theater, Sharjah. Swelah wrote a book "The Ability of an Actor" in 2015. He has appeared in several comedy shows in UAE cinemas.
